Noorte Hääl (meaning Voice of Youth in English) was a daily newspaper published in Estonia between 1940 and 1995.

History
Before the independence of Estonia Noorte Hääl was owned by the Estonian branch of the Komsomol, the Leninist Young Communist League of Estonia.

Noorte Hääl was renamed on 1 February 1990 as Päevaleht which ceased publication in 1995.

References

1940 establishments in the Soviet Union
1995 disestablishments in Estonia
Defunct newspapers published in Estonia
Estonian-language newspapers
Newspapers established in 1940
Publications disestablished in 1995